Bobby Gerald Jackson (January 10, 1936 – October 12, 2009) was a professional American football player who played defensive back for two seasons for the Philadelphia Eagles and Chicago Bears.

Playing career
He was the first starting quarterback for Bear Bryant at Alabama. In his senior season, he played in the Blue-Gray Classic in Montgomery, the Senior Bowl in Mobile and the College All-Star Game.

He was drafted by the Packers in 1959 in the 7th round, but was released by the Packers. He was signed by the Philadelphia Eagles as a defensive back for the 1960 season, a season that was the Eagles' first title championship since 1949. After one season with the Bears, he retired, having played 21 games. He also served as a kick returner, with one return for five yards.

Life after football
After retirement, he worked for Shell Oil for 10 years and also worked for WKSJ radio for 23 years, retiring in 2006. He was also active in the Red Elephant Club, NFL Players Association and Mardi Gras Society. He was elected to the Mobile Sports Hall of Fame in 1997.

He died at the age of 73 after multiple years of battling Alzheimer's Disease.

See also
 Alabama Crimson Tide football yearly statistical leaders

References

1936 births
2009 deaths
American football quarterbacks
American football defensive backs
Philadelphia Eagles players
Chicago Bears players
Alabama Crimson Tide football players